Dafydd Rhys ap Thomas (1912-2011) was a Welsh theologian, specialising in Old Testament studies.

Early life and education
Thomas was born in Menai Bridge, Anglesey on 2 May 1912. His family included his parents, Jeanette and Rev. W. Keinion Thomas, and siblings Gwyn, Alon, Iwan, Jac, and Truda. He attended Beaumaris Grammar School after having been home-schooled. He studied Semitic and Hebrew Languages in Bangor and graduated with honors from the University College of North Wales in 1934. From Mansfield College, Oxford, he received a M.A. in theology. He also received a B.D. He then traveled to Berlin in 1937, where he had planned to complete his doctoral dissertation. At that time, though, the political climate and the threat of war in Nazi Germany made the situation untenable.

Career
He became a lecturer in Hebrew at the University College in 1938, and was later made senior lecturer. During that time, he was at Toronto University as a visiting lecturer on occasion. For one year, he worked in Canaan at an archaeological site. Thomas retired in 1977.

Thomas was an author, translator, and editor. He wrote A primer of Old Testament text criticism, the first edition was published in 1947 and the second edition in 1961, and was co-author of Gramadeg Hebraeg y Beibl, which was published in 1976. His co-author was Gwilym H. Jones. In 1962, his first edition of the translation of the two-volume Norwegen work The Psalms in Israel's Worship by Sigmund Mowinckel was published. He also translated works of Martin Noth and Otto Eissfeldt and helped translate the Old Testament for the New Welsh Bible. Between 1976 and 1990, the University of Wales Press published a series he edited, Beibl a Chrefydd.

He was secretary of Colleg Bala-Bangor, secretary and president of the Society for Old Testament Study, and president of the Union of Welsh Independents. Thomas was a lay minister and preacher at the Welsh Independents Hirael chapel in Bangor.

Personal life
In 1940, Thomas married Menna Davies, whose parents were Marianne and Rev. George Davies. They lived with their children, Marion and Keinion, in Menai Bridge and Bangor.

His wife died in August 2004. He died 19 May 2011. Her grave and his ashes are buried in Blaenau Ffestiniog.

References 

Welsh scholars and academics
Welsh theologians
1912 births
2011 deaths
21st-century Welsh theologians
20th-century Welsh theologians
21st-century Welsh writers
20th-century Welsh writers
Alumni of Mansfield College, Oxford